Lindmania is a genus of plants in the family Bromeliaceae. It is one of two genera in the subfamily Lindmanioideae, and contains 39 species. All but one of the known species are native to Venezuela, a few occurring in neighboring Guyana and northern Brazil).

The genus name is for Carl Axel Magnus Lindman, Swedish botanist (1856-1928).

Species

 Lindmania arachnoidea (L.B. Smith, Steyermark & Robinson) L.B. Smith - Venezuelan State of Amazonas
 Lindmania argentea L.B. Smith - Bolívar
 Lindmania atrorosea (L.B. Smith, Steyermark & Robinson) L.B. Smith - Bolívar
 Lindmania aurea L.B. Smith, Steyermark & Robinson - Bolívar
 Lindmania brachyphylla L.B. Smith - Bolívar
 Lindmania candelabriformis B. Holst - Venezuelan State of Amazonas
 Lindmania cylindrostachya L.B. Smith - Venezuelan State of Amazonas
 Lindmania dendritica (L.B. Smith) L.B. Smith - Cerro de la Neblina (Venezuelan State of Amazonas and Brazilian State of Amazonas)
 Lindmania dyckioides (L.B. Smith) L.B. Smith  - Bolívar
 Lindmania geniculata L.B. Smith  - Venezuelan States of Amazonas and Bolívar
 Lindmania gracillima (L.B. Smith) L.B. Smith - Bolívar
 Lindmania guianensis (Beer) Mez - Guyana, Bolívar
 Lindmania holstii Steyermark & L.B. Smith - Bolívar
 Lindmania huberi L.B. Smith, Steyermark & Robinson - Bolívar
 Lindmania imitans L.B. Smith, Steyermark & Robinson - Bolívar
 Lindmania lateralis (L.B. Smith & R.W. Read) L.B. Smith & Robinson - Venezuelan State of Amazonas
 Lindmania longipes (L.B. Smith) L.B. Smith - Bolívar
 Lindmania maguirei (L.B. Smith) L.B. Smith - Cerro de la Neblina (Venezuelan State of Amazonas and Brazilian State of Amazonas)
 Lindmania marahuacae (L.B. Smith, Steyermark & Robinson) L.B. Smith - Venezuelan State of Amazonas
 Lindmania minor L.B. Smith - Bolívar
 Lindmania navioides L.B. Smith - Bolívar
 Lindmania nubigena (L.B. Smith) L.B. Smith - Venezuelan State of Amazonas
 Lindmania oliva-estevae Steyermark & L.B. Smith ex B. Holst - Bolívar
 Lindmania phelpsiae L.B. Smith - Venezuelan State of Amazonas
 Lindmania piresii L.B. Smith, Steyermark & Robinson - Brazilian State of Amazonas
 Lindmania riparia L.B. Smith, Steyermark & Robinson - Bolívar
 Lindmania saxicola L.B. Smith, Steyermark & Robinson - Bolívar
 Lindmania serrulata L.B. Smith - Bolívar
 Lindmania smithiana (Steyermark & Luteyn) L.B. Smith - Bolívar
 Lindmania stenophylla L.B. Smith - Bolívar
 Lindmania steyermarkii L.B. Smith - Bolívar
 Lindmania subsimplex L.B. Smith - Bolívar
 Lindmania thyrsoidea L.B. Smith - Venezuelan State of Amazonas
 Lindmania tillandsioides L.B. Smith - Bolívar
 Lindmania vinotincta B.Holst & Vivas - Bolívar
 Lindmania wurdackii L.B. Smith - Venezuelan State of Amazonas

References

External links
 FCBS Lindmania Photos
 BSI Genera Gallery photos

 
Bromeliaceae genera
Flora of Venezuela